Eusko Gudariak (originally spelt Euzko Gudariak, "Basque Soldiers") was the republican anthem of the Eusko Gudarostea, the army of the Basque Autonomous Government during the Spanish Civil War. The song used to refer to the defense of the Basque country within the Republic of Spain against the nationalist Spain army.

It is also used as an anthem by ETA and the organizations orbiting the Basque National Liberation Movement.

The music is a traditional Basque tune from Araba, named . The lyrics were composed in 1932 by José María de Gárate, an officer of the EAJ-PNV. During the war, Captain Alejandro Lizaso Eizmendi added some verses.

Basque

English translation
We are the Basque Soldiers
to free the Basque Country
we have ready our blood
to give it for it

An irrintzi1 has been heard
on the top of the mountain,
let's go, all the soldiers
behind the Basque flag

 1 Irrintzi, literally "neigh", is a high-pitched scream used in celebrations and to call others at long distances.

See also
Gernikako arbola, a traditional Basque anthem
Gora ta gora, official Basque anthem
Oriamendi, a traditional Carlist anthem
El Himno de Riego, the anthem of the Second Spanish Republic
A Las Barricadas, Spanish anarchist anthem
Marcha Real, the anthem of Francoist Spain and the Kingdom of Spain
Cara al sol, the Falange anthem
The Internationale, socialist anthem

References

External links
Canciones republicanas de la Guerra Civil Española . Lyrics with Spanish translation.

Basque music
Basque history
Spanish anthems
Political party songs
Songs of the Spanish Civil War